Anthony Victor James Yoka (born 28 April 1992) is a French professional boxer. As an amateur, he won a bronze medal at the 2015 European Games; and gold at the 2015 World Championships and 2016 Olympics.

Amateur career 
Yoka won the gold medal against future WBO heavyweight champion Joseph Parker in the super heavyweight division at the 2010 Summer Youth Olympics in Singapore. At the 2010 Youth World Amateur Boxing Championships he lost the final to Filip Hrgović. In 2011 he lost at the European (Senior) Championships to Olympic Champion Roberto Cammarelle. At the 2011 World Amateur Boxing Championships he outpointed Jasem Delavari from Iran but was knocked out by Cuban Erislandy Savón. At the 2012 European Boxing Olympic Qualification Tournament he beat three opponents before getting stopped by Magomed Omarov.

In 2015, Yoka first missed a chance to get the gold at the 2015 European Games but still managed to get the bronze medal. Following this achievement, Yoka won the gold at the 2015 AIBA World Boxing Championships, earning him a spot at the 2016 Olympic Games at Rio de Janeiro.

Yoka won the gold over the British boxer Joe Joyce in the super heavyweight division at the 2016 Olympic Games, earning France its first Super Heavyweight gold medal.

Before this fight, Yoka had beaten Hussein Ishaish in the quarter-final, and Filip Hrgović in the semi-final. His amateur record was 60 wins and 12 losses.

Professional career 
In 2017 Yoka turned professional. Trained by Virgil Hunter, Yoka fought and beat Travis Clark in his debut fight at Le Palais des Sports in Paris, in June 2017. In October 2017, Yoka defeated Jonathan Rice via unanimous decision 59–56, 60–54, and 58–56.

In July 2018, the French Anti-Doping Agency banned him for one year because of missing three drug tests between July 2016 and July 2017. His appeal against the ruling was rejected by the French Council of State in August 2018.

On 28 September 2019, Yoka faced Michael Wallisch. Yoka dropped Wallisch in the third round and Wallisch barely beat the count, which prompted the referee to wave the fight off and award Yoka the TKO victory.

In his next fight, Yoka faced former world title challenger and veteran countryman Johann Duhaupas. Yoka cruised past his experienced opponent, dropping him twice in the first round, the second time also being the final one from which Duhaupas would not get up.

On 27 November 2020, Yoka faced another veteran in Christian Hammer. Hammer caused Yoka some problems during the fight, but Yoka's win was never at risk, and went on to win the fight via unanimous decision, 100–89 on all three scorecards.

Yoka faced the former IBF International heavyweight titlist Joel Tambwe Djeko for the vacant European Union heavyweight title. The bout was scheduled for March 5, 2021, at the H Arena in Nantes, France. It was broadcast on ESPN+ in the US and Canal+ in France. He won the fight by a late twelfth-round technical knockout. A well place jab forced Djeko to turn his back and stop defending himself, which forced the referee to wave the fight off at the very last second.

Yoka was next set to face the undefeated Croatian heavyweight Petar Milas on September 10, 2021, at the Stade Roland Garros in Paris, France. Yoka was the bigger and more experienced boxer heading into the bout, and accordingly entered as a betting favorite. Yoka's fight was once again broadcast on ESPN+ in the US and Canal+ in France. Yoka won the fight by technical knockout, stopping Milas at the very last second of the seventh round.

Yoka was expected to face Carlos Takam on January 15, 2022, in a fight which was supposed to take place at the Accor Arena in Paris, France. Shortly after the bout was scheduled however, Takam withdrew due to injury. On December 10, 2021, it was announced that Martin Bakole would step in as Takam's replacement. The fight was postponed on December 28, 2021, due to measures imposed to combat the spread of COVID-19. Yoka instead chose to enter negotiations to face Filip Hrgović in an IBF title eliminator. The IBF later ruled Yoka ineligible to enter an agreement with any opponent other than Martin Bakole, as the two had already signed contracts to face each other. Yoka's fight with Bakole was rescheduled for May 14. He lost the fight by majority decision, after suffering two knockdowns, in the first and fifth rounds.

Professional boxing record

See also
 Boxing at the 2010 Summer Youth Olympics
 Boxing at the 2016 Summer Olympics
 List of Youth Olympic Games gold medalists who won Olympic gold medals

References

External links
 
  (archive)
 
 
 
Tony Yoka - Profile, News Archive & Current Rankings at Box.Live

1992 births
Living people
French sportspeople of Republic of the Congo descent
Boxers from Paris
Heavyweight boxers
Boxers at the 2010 Summer Youth Olympics
Boxers at the 2012 Summer Olympics
Olympic boxers of France
French male boxers
AIBA World Boxing Championships medalists
Boxers at the 2015 European Games
Boxers at the 2016 Summer Olympics
European Games bronze medalists for France
Olympic gold medalists for France
Olympic medalists in boxing
Medalists at the 2016 Summer Olympics
European Games medalists in boxing
Youth Olympic gold medalists for France
French sportspeople in doping cases
Doping cases in boxing